The Ilyushin Il-30 was a Soviet turbojet-powered tactical bomber designed as a higher-performance, swept wing version of the Ilyushin Il-28, in the late 1940s. Its thin wing and engine nacelles necessitated the use of tandem landing gear, the first Soviet aircraft to do so. It was apparently canceled before the prototype made its first flight, although sources disagree with this.

Development
The Il-30 was a follow-on to the Il-28, although design began on 21 June 1948, before the Il-28 had flown. The design took that of the Il-28 as a starting point, but had thin, mid-mounted swept wings with a 35° sweep angle, chosen to allow the aircraft to reach its required speed. It was intended to be powered by two new Lyulka TR-3 axial-flow turbojet engines with 45.1 kN (10,140 lbf) thrust each in wing-mounted nacelles. Both the fuselage and the nacelles were area ruled.

Thin wings and the 2° anhedral necessary to cure the excessive lateral stability limited the amount of fuel that could be carried and tip tanks were required to meet the range requirement. The slim engine nacelles did not allow the main landing gear to be stowed there as was done in the Il-28. The solution was to house them within the fuselage — the first bicycle landing gear on a Soviet aircraft — with small, twin-wheeled, outriggers mounted underneath the nacelles to stabilize the aircraft on the ground.

The aircraft had a crew of four, the pilot, a bombardier, and two gunners. The pilot, bombardier and dorsal gunner shared one pressurized compartment that was subdivided into (firstly) a bombardier's position in the extensively glazed nose, and (secondly)  a combined cockpit and dorsal turret (Il-V-12): the pilot and dorsal gunner were effectively placed back-to-back underneath the canopy. The tail gunner had a separate, pressurized turret (Il-K6) at the rear of the aircraft. Defensive armament was six  Nudelman-Rikhter NR-23 cannon: two fixed firing forward and one pair in each  turret. Maximum bomb load was 

The initial results were favorable, and a full-scale mockup was formally reviewed in March 1949. The prototype was completed by August 1949, but an incident involving the rival swept-wing Tupolev Tu-82 that broke an engine mount during a low-altitude flight led to delays as additional tests were demanded to determine the strength of the wings before the first flight was made. By the following year, the Il-30 program had lost momentum as the Ilyushin OKB was ordered to concentrate its resources on facilitating the service introduction of the Il-28. The Il-30 program was formally terminated by government order on 20 August 1950, and the prototype was eventually scrapped at the beginning of the 1960s. Aviation historian Bill Gunston quotes a maiden flight date of 9 September 1949, but Vaclav Nemecek says 1951.

Although the Il-30 never actually flew, it was the subject of much (misinformed) speculation in the West.

Specifications (estimated)

See also

References

Citations

Bibliography

External links

 Il-30 on ram-home.com

Il-030
Abandoned military aircraft projects of the Soviet Union
1940s Soviet bomber aircraft
Twinjets

fr:Ilyushin Il-28 Beagle